, commonly written as 西部ガス, is a Japanese gas company based in Fukuoka, Japan. It supplies gas to the Northern Kyushu region, including in the area of Fukuoka, Saga, Nagasaki, and Kumamoto.

Timeline
In 1902, Nagasaki Gas was founded as Kyushu's first gas company. In 1913, Nagasaki Gas merged with 3 other gas companies in the Northern Kyushu region to create the Saibu Gas Conglomerate. On December 1, 1930, Saibu Gas was founded by acquiring business of Toho Gas Kyushu Branch operations in Fukuoka, Kumamoto, Nagasaki, and Sasebo. Headquarters located in Chiyo, Hakata-ku, Fukuoka. In 1943, Saibu Gas merged with Kyushu Gas. The headquarters moved to Kego, Chūō-ku, Fukuoka in 1954 and to Chiyo in 1988. In 2009, Saibu Gas acquired business of Kurume City Gas Bureau. The company established a representative office in Singapore in 2018.

References

External links 
Saibu Gas website (Japanese)
Saibu Gas website (English)

Companies listed on the Tokyo Stock Exchange
Companies listed on the Osaka Exchange
Companies based in Fukuoka Prefecture
Natural gas companies of Japan